This is a listing of lists of country codes:
 List of ISO country codes (ISO 3166)
 ITU country code (International Telecommunication Union)
 List of country calling codes E.164
 Mobile country code E.212
 Maritime identification digits
 List of ITU letter codes (radiocommunication division)
 UIC country code (International Union of Railways)
 List of GS1 country codes
 List of NATO country codes
 List of IOC country codes (International Olympic Committee)
 List of FIFA country codes (International Federation of Association Football)
 List of FIPS country codes
 List of vehicle registration codes

Lists of country codes by country
A –
B –
C –
D–E –
F –
G –
H–I –
J–K –
L –
M –
N –
O–Q –
R –
S –
T –
U–Z

Lists by country